TPC of Myrtle Beach is a golf resort located off South Carolina Highway 707 in Burgess, South Carolina, near Murrells Inlet in the Myrtle Beach metropolitan area.
The Tom Fazio designed championship golf course is a member of the PGA Tour's Tournament Players Club network. It has hosted several prestigious golf tournaments, including the IR Senior Tour Championship, the season ending event on the Senior PGA Tour, in 2000.

References

External links
Official site

Tourist attractions in Myrtle Beach, South Carolina
Golf clubs and courses in South Carolina
Sports venues in Horry County, South Carolina